Parachute club may refer to:
 a club of parachuting and skydiving enthusiasts
 The Parachute Club, a Canadian band